Peter Gray (born 14 August 1935) is an Irish sailor. He competed in the Flying Dutchman event at the 1960 Summer Olympics.

References

External links
 

1935 births
Living people
Irish male sailors (sport)
Olympic sailors of Ireland
Sailors at the 1960 Summer Olympics – Flying Dutchman
People from Dún Laoghaire
Sportspeople from Dún Laoghaire–Rathdown